Bārakzai (Bārakzay; plur. , Bārakzī) is the name of a Pashtun tribe from present-day, Kandahar, Afghanistan. '"Barakzai" is a common name among the Pashtuns and it means "son of Barak" in Pashto. According to the Encyclopædia Iranica, "In the detailed Pashtun genealogies there are no fewer than seven instances of the ethnic name Bārakzī, at very different levels of tribal segmentation. Six of them designate simple lineages within six different tribes located in the Solaymān mountains or adjacent lands... The seventh instance, on the other hand, designates one of the most important Pashtun tribes in numbers and historic role, part of the Zīrak branch of the Dorrānay confederation.

History
Ludwig W. Adamec wrote that the Barakzai are "an important section of the Zirak branch of the Durrani to which the former Barakzai/Muhammadzai ruling family belongs. In numbers, economic, and political strength, the Barakzai were the paramount tribe of Afghanistan...They were soldiers in the service of Nadir Shah, founder of the short-lived Afsharid dynasty in Iran, and were settled on land seized from the Ghilzai. They continued to hold jagirs, fiefs, in exchange for their military services to Ahmad Shah Durrani. When Painda Khan, leader of the Barakzais, was assassinated, the Barakzai chiefs under Dost Muhammad ousted and replaced the Sadozai dynasty. The Barakzai continue to possess large areas of agricultural land and extensive flocks in the area between Herat and Kandahar."

Mohammadzai 
Mohammadzai are the most prominent & powerful sub-tribe of Barakzai, they belong to the Zirak branch of the Durrani confederacy, and are primarily centered around Kandahar. They can also be found in other provinces throughout Afghanistan as well across the border in the Pakistan's Balochistan Province.

The Musahiban, originally the Yahya Khel clan, are descendants of Sultan Mohammad Khan. Mohammadzai Barakzai are closely related to Amanullah Khan.

Payendah Khel are descendants of Payendah Khan, head of the Mohammadzai branch of the Barakzai tribe during the reigns of Timur and Zaman Shah, who became rulers with the decline of the Sadozai dynasty.

The Tarzi family is a branch of the Mohammadzai of Afghanistan.  The founder of Tarzi family was Ghulam Muhammad Tarzi.

Shaghasi 
Shaghasi are the second most prominent & powerful sub-tribe of Barakzai, they belong to the Zirak branch of the Durrani confederacy, and are primarily centered around Kandahar. They can also be found in other provinces throughout central Afghanistan.

The Shaghasi Khel were even more powerful than the Mohammadzai during the rulling of Emir Sher Ali Khan - Emir of Afghanistan, and Emir Amanullah Khan - Emir of Afghanistan (February 28, 1919 – 1926), later King of Afghanistan (1926 - January 14, 1929). Shaghasi Barakzai are closely related to Amanullah Khan. Queen Sawar Sultana Begum Shaghasi  daughter of Loinab Sher Dil Khan of Shaghasi, Governor of Balkh was King Amanullah Khan's mother.

Ali Ahmad Khan Shaghasi (1883–1929) who was declared King of Afghanistan twice in 1929 was also Shaghasi Barakzai.

Politics
From 1826 to 1978, most rulers of Afghanistan belonged to the two branches of one Barakzai dynasty descending from the chiefs of the Barakzai tribe (belonging to the Mohammadzai sub-tribe).

Emir Dost Muhammad Khan Barakzai - (First Mohammadzai Ruler)
Emir Sher Ali Khan - Emir of Afghanistan
Emir Yaqub Khan - Emir of Afghanistan, Signed treaty of Gandamak.
Emir Abdur Rahman Khan - Emir of Afghanistan (October 1879/July 22, 1880 – October 3, 1901)
Emir Habibullah Khan - Emir of Afghanistan (October 3, 1901 - February 20, 1919)
Queen Sarwar Sultana Begum or (Ulya (Ulli) Hazrat) (1875 – 1965), was an Afghan royal consort married to Habibullah Khan (r. 1901–1919), and mother of king Amanullah Khan (r. 1919–1929).
Emir Amanullah Khan - Emir of Afghanistan (February 28, 1919 – 1926), later King of Afghanistan (1926 - January 14, 1929)
Queen Soraya Tarzi (w. of King Amanullah Khan) (November 29, 1899 - April 20, 1968).
King Inayatullah Khan (January 14, 1929 - January 17, 1929).
Emir Ali Ahmad Khan (January 17, 1929 - February 19, 1929) (June 23, 1929 - July 3, 1929).
Mahmud Tarzi - Poet, Author and Diplomat. Credited for the modernization of Afghanistan.
Loinab Sher Dil Khan Shaghasi, Governor of Balkh
Loinab Khush Dil Khan Ghazi, Governor of Kabul and Kandahar
Sardar Rahmdil Khan - Ruler of Kandahar & Baluchistan
Sardar Kohan Dil Khan - Ruler of Kandahar & Baluchistan
Sardar Payinda Khan - Ruler of Kandahar & Baluchistan. Father of All Mohammadzai's
King Mohammed Nadir Shah (October 17, 1929 - November 8, 1933).
King Mohammed Zahir Shah (November 8, 1933 - July 17, 1973.
President Mohammed Daoud Khan (First Afghan President) (July 18, 1973 - April 28, 1978)

Languages
The principal language of Barakzai is Pashto. Dari is also used as the language for records and correspondence.

See also
Khel (clan)
Barakzai dynasty
Mohammadzai
Shaghasi
Nawab of Pataudi

References

External links
http://www.khyber.org/pashtotribes/b/barakzai.shtml
http://magog.web-site.co.il/gog/e_tribes.shtml

Durrani Pashtun tribes
Sarbani Pashtun tribes
Surnames
Ethnic groups in Afghanistan
Social groups of Pakistan